Ashit Desai (born 16 May 1951) is an Indian composer, vocalist, musician and music director. He composes scores for films, TV serials, dance productions and dramas. He is known as Gujarati Sugam Sangeet artist.

Early life
Ashit was born in 1951 to Kunjbihari and Mayuriben Desai in Baroda, Bombay State (now Vadodara, Gujarat). Initially he learned music from his parents. He graduated in Commerce and took a Diploma in vocal music from M. S. University of Baroda and migrated to Mumbai for career opportunities.

Career

Ashit has composed scores for dramas, dance ballets, TV serials & films.  The Sitar Maestro Pandit Ravi Shankar had enlisted him in composing music for the Asiad and placed him in charge of overall coordination of cultural events. His has won wide acclaim for the music direction in the Hindi Television serial Chanakya on Doordarshan.  The devotional songs for Richard Attenborough's film Gandhi are sung by him. In 1988, he conducted Ravi Shankar orchestral compositions at the closing ceremony of the Festival of India in Moscow. In 1989, He assisted Ravi Shankar as orchestra conductor and singer in his ballet Ghanashyam. He has given music in Hindi film Viruddh... Family Comes First produced by Amitabh Bachchan.

Awards
 All India Radio's Best Singer Award in 1969 (At the Age of 18)
 Gujarat State Award in 1976
 Asiad Jyoti Medal by the President of India
 "Pt. Omkarnath Thakur Award." of Gujarat State in 1989
 2017 - Sangeet Natak Akademi Award (Category : Music for Dance)
 Award for Best Music Director for the Gujarati TV serial "Shraddha"

Personal life
He is married to Hema Desai who is also singer.  Their Son Alap Desai is also a music artist, whose album Pehchan was Nominated under the category of Best Gazal Album in Global Indian Music Academy Awards-2016.

Discography

Music Composer
Yoga Unveiled (2004)
Hanuman Vandana (2007)
Ballet "Ganaga" (2019) starring Hema Malini.
Ballet "Geet Govind " (2014) starring Hema Malini.
Songs of Narasinh Mehta (1996), Navaras Records.
Jai Jai Shrinathaji (1995), Navaras Records.

Soundtrack
Rock Band (Video Game 2007)

Producer
Pehchaan (2015)

References

External links
 

Living people
Indian male playback singers
1951 births
Indian composers
Recipients of the Sangeet Natak Akademi Award